If the Music's Loud Enough... is the second studio album released by the North Vancouver punk band d.b.s. It was released by Nefer Records in 1996. In the week of 16 January to 23 January 1997, the album appeared at #24 on the Canadian Top 50 music chart.

Track listing 
 "No Room" – 2:03
 "P.E." – 1:17
 "I Wanna Go Home" – 2:16
 "The Truce" – 1:41
 "The Scottish Drinkin' Song" – 2:09
 "Friend" – 2:58
 "Uh… Hi" – 0:53
 "If You Really Had No Fear…" – 1:47
 "Red" – 2:17
 "Axiom" – 1:34
 "PolitiKill Song" – 2:39
 "Reality Is Rated 'R'" – 1:53
 "Survive" – 2:32
 "Not Horrible" – 2:51
 "Perspective" – 3:20
 "Give 'em the Muzak" – 2:05

Personnel 
 Andy Dixon – guitar, backing vocals
 Jesse Gander – vocals
 Paul Patko – drums, backing vocals
 Dhani Borges – bass guitar

References 

D.b.s. albums
1996 albums